Malaba, Uganda is a town in Tororo District in the Eastern Region of Uganda, on its eastern border with Kenya. It sits adjacent from Malaba, Kenya, across the Malaba River that marks the border between Uganda and Kenya.

Location
The coordinates of the town are 0°38'40.0"N, 34°15'38.0"E (Latitude:0.644444; Longitude:34.260556).

Overview
Malaba is a busy crossing point between Uganda and Kenya. In 2013, it was the second-busiest border crossing between Uganda and Kenya, based on the volume of informal exports and imports.

Population
The national census in 2002 estimated the population of the town at 7,600. In 2010, the Uganda Bureau of Statistics (UBOS) estimated the population at 9,200. In 2011, UBOS estimated the population at 9,500. During the 2014 national population census, the population was enumerated at 18,224. 

In 2015, UBOS estimated the population of Malaba, Uganda at 18,400. In 2020, the population agency estimated the midyear population of the town at 20,800. Of these, 10,800 (51.9 percent) were female and 10,000 (48.1 percent) were male. UBOS calculated the population of the town to have expanded at an average annual rate of 2.5 percent, between 2015 and 2020.

One stop border crossing
In February 2015, work was completed on the one stop  border post at Malaba, Uganda. The new building contains offices of the Uganda Revenue Authority, Uganda Customs, and Uganda Immigration Services. In these offices, Ugandan officers are joined by their counterparts from Kenya to clear customers who are exiting Uganda to enter Kenya. In a similar building, with similar provisions, on the Kenyan side, officers from both countries clear travelers leaving Kenya to enter Uganda. This eases border formalities and reduces waiting times for travelers.

The project was funded by the World Bank, TradeMark East Africa, and the Kenyan and Ugandan governments. The building at Malaba, Uganda cost UGX:15 billion. Similar arrangements have been made at the Busia, Mutukula, Mirama Hills, Katuna, and Elegu border posts.

See also
 Railway stations in Uganda
 List of cities and towns in Uganda

References

External links
How Not to Cross the Border Overland from Kenya to Uganda

Populated places in Eastern Region, Uganda
Tororo District
Kenya–Uganda border crossings